One Sweet Morning is a four-movement song cycle for mezzo-soprano solo and orchestra by the American composer John Corigliano.  The work was jointly commissioned by the New York Philharmonic and the Shanghai Symphony Orchestra to commemorate the 10th anniversary of the September 11 attacks.  It was given its world premiere on September 30, 2011, by the mezzo-soprano Stephanie Blythe and the New York Philharmonic under the conductor Alan Gilbert.  The piece is dedicated to the memory of Natalie and Serge Koussevitzky.

Composition

Background
The New York Philharmonic had once before approached Corigliano to compose a 9/11 tribute on the 1st anniversary of the attacks.  The composer, believing the shock of the event to be too fresh, turned the commission down.  The orchestra then approached the composer John Adams, whose piece On the Transmigration of Souls later won the 2002 Pulitzer Prize for Music.

Corigliano described the challenge of composing a 9/11 commemoration in the score program notes, writing:
He continued:

Structure
One Sweet Morning has a duration of roughly 28 minutes and is composed in four movements:
A Song on the End of the World
Patroclus
War South of the Great Wall
One Sweet Morning

The first movement is set to the poem "A Song on the End of the World" by the Polish poet Czesław Miłosz.  The second movement is set to a portion of Homer's Iliad detailing a massacre led by the Greek prince Patroclus.  The third movement is set to the poem "War South of the Great Wall" by the 8th-century poet Li Po.  The fourth and final movement is set to the eponymous anti-war poem "One Sweet Morning" by the American lyricist and poet E. Y. "Yip" Harburg.

Instrumentation
The work is scored for a solo mezzo-soprano and a large orchestra comprising three flutes (third doubling piccolo), three oboes, three clarinets (first and second doubling clarinet in A; third doubling bass clarinet and E-flat clarinet), three bassoons (third doubling contrabassoon), four horns, three trumpets, two trombones, bass trombone, tuba, timpani, four percussionists, piano (doubling celesta), harp, and strings.

Reception
One Sweet Morning has been praised by music critics.  Reviewing the world premiere, Anthony Tommasini of The New York Times wrote:

Rob Cowan of Gramophone called it an "imposing song-cycle" and observed, "Writing it must have proved a challenging and in some respects unenviable task, given the need to balance the inevitable emotional imperative with a sense of distance necessary if durable art is going to be the outcome, which I think, in this case, it is."  He added:

Martin Bernheimer of the Financial Times, however, gave the piece a more mixed response, remarking:

See also
List of compositions by John Corigliano

References

Compositions by John Corigliano
2010 compositions
Classical song cycles in English
Musical settings of poems by Czesław Miłosz
Music about the September 11 attacks
Music commissioned by the New York Philharmonic
Music commissioned by the Shanghai Symphony Orchestra